Christopher Anderson may refer to:
 Christopher Anderson (theologian) (1782–1852), Scottish theologian
 Christopher M. Anderson, American music director
 Christopher W. Anderson (born 1970), American wrestler, real name Chris Wright
 Christopher Anderson (born 1972), American folk musician, part of Chris and Thomas
 Christopher B. Anderson (born 1976), American ecologist
 Christopher Anderson (footballer, born 1925) (1925–1986), Scottish footballer
 Christopher Anderson (footballer, born 1990), English footballer
 Christopher Anderson (photographer) (born 1970), Canadian photographer

See also
 Chris Anderson (disambiguation)
 Chris Andersen (born 1978), American former basketball player
 Christopher Andersen (born 1949), American journalist and author